Adrian Constantin Alexandru Păun (born 1 April 1995) is a Romanian professional footballer who plays as an attacking midfielder or a winger for Israeli Premier League club Hapoel Be'er Sheva.

Păun spent most of his professional career at CFR Cluj, for which he made his debut in 2014 and appeared in over 230 Liga I games. In 2022, he moved abroad for the first time by signing for Hapoel Be'er Sheva on an initial loan.

Club career
Păun recorded his Liga I debut for CFR Cluj on 14 March 2014, in a 2–2 away draw with Corona Brașov. He scored his first goal for the team on 28 April 2015, in a 2–1 home victory over Concordia Chiajna.

On 28 September 2022, Păun joined Israeli club Hapoel Be'er Sheva on a season-long loan with an option to buy. On 15 November that year, it was announced that he signed for Be'er Sheva on a permanent deal until 2026.

International career
Păun was called up to the Romania national team for the first time by coach Cosmin Contra on 30 August 2019, for the UEFA Euro 2020 qualification matches against Spain and Malta. He finally registered his debut on 6 June 2021 by starting in a 0–1 friendly loss to England.

Career statistics

Club

International

Honours
CFR Cluj
 Liga I: 2017–18, 2018–19, 2019–20, 2020–21, 2021–22
 Cupa României: 2015–16
 Supercupa României: 2018, 2020

References

External links

1995 births
Living people
People from Drăgășani
Romanian footballers
Association football midfielders
Association football wingers
CFR Cluj players
Hapoel Be'er Sheva F.C. players
Liga I players
Israeli Premier League players
Romanian expatriate footballers
Expatriate footballers in Israel
Romanian expatriate sportspeople in Israel
Romania youth international footballers
Romania under-21 international footballers
Romania international footballers